Savigniorrhipis is a genus of Portuguese sheet weavers that was first described by J. Wunderlich in 1992.  it contains only two species, both found on the Azores: S. acoreensis and S. topographicus.

See also
 List of Linyphiidae species (Q–Z)

References

Araneomorphae genera
Endemic arthropods of the Azores
Linyphiidae
Spiders of Macaronesia